The 2003 Limerick Senior Hurling Championship was the 109th staging of the Limerick Senior Hurling Championship since its establishment by the Limerick County Board.

Adare were the defending champions.

On 12 October 2003, Patrickswell won the championship after a 1-13 to 0-14 defeat of Adare in the final. It was their first title in three championship seasons and their 18th championship title overall which allowed them to draw level with Ahane at the top of the all-time roll of honour.

Results

Final

References

Limerick Senior Hurling Championship
Limerick Senior Hurling Championship